Colgan is an Irish surname, an Anglicized form of Irish Ó Colgáin meaning "descendant of Colga", a personal name based on colg "thorn," "sword." Notable people with the surname include:

Arthur Colgan (born 1946), American Roman Catholic bishop
Charles J. Colgan (1926-2017), American Democratic politician and businessman from Virginia
Eileen Colgan (c. 1934 – 2014), Irish actress
Flavia Colgan, American Democratic strategist
Gerry Colgan (1951–2011), Scottish teacher and footballer
Jenny Colgan, British novelist
John Colgan, Irish hagiographer and historian
Michael Colgan (disambiguation), multiple people
Nick Colgan, Irish football goalkeeper
Stevyn Colgan, Cornish writer, artist and songwriter

See also
Colgan, North Dakota, unincorporated community, United States
Colgan Air, an American regional airline

Surnames of Irish origin